Francis Lascelles may refer to:

Francis Lascelles (1612–1667), regicide who sat in judgement on King Charles I
Francis Lascelles (British Army officer) (1744–1799), general in the British Army
Francis Lascelles Jardine (1841–1919), Australian pioneer associated with the exploration and settlement of Far North Queensland
 Sir Francis William Lascelles (1890–1979), Clerk of the Parliaments, 1953–1959
Frank Lascelles (diplomat) (1841–1920), British diplomat
Frank Lascelles (pageant master) (1875–1934), British pageant master